The 2011 Tennessee State Tigers football team represented Tennessee State University as a member of the a member of the Ohio Valley Conference (OVC) in the 2011 NCAA Division I FCS football season. The Tigers were led by second-year head coach Rod Reed and played their home games at LP Field. They finished the season 5–6 overall and 4–4 in OVC play to tie for fifth place.

Schedule

References

Tennessee State
Tennessee State Tigers football seasons
Tennessee State Tigers football